Ivan Lendl was the defending champion, but did not participate this year.

Michael Stich won the title, defeating Petr Korda 6–2, 2–6, 6–3 in the final.

Seeds

  Michael Stich (champion)
  Andrei Medvedev (first round)
  Cédric Pioline (second round)
  Magnus Gustafsson (quarterfinals)
  Petr Korda (final)
  Marc Rosset (second round)
  Arnaud Boetsch (first round)
  Wayne Ferreira (quarterfinals)

Draw

Finals

Top half

Bottom half

External links
 Singles draw

Singles